Marie Tømmerbakke (born 10 January 1993) is a former Norwegian handball player, who last played for København Håndbold.

She also represented Norway in the 2011 Women's Junior European Handball Championship, placing 12th, and in the 2012 Women's Junior World Handball Championship, placing 8th.

Achievements 
World Youth Championship:
Silver Medalist: 2010

Individual awards
 All-Star Goalkeeper of Grundigligaen: 2015/2016, 2016/2017

References

1993 births
Living people
Sportspeople from Fredrikstad
Norwegian female handball players